The Pingry EP is an extended play by American indie band Tally Hall. It was specially recorded for a show played at The Pingry School in Martinsville, New Jersey, on May 13, 2005. The band made the long trip from Michigan to New Jersey because member Andrew Horowitz is a Pingry alumnus.

The EP features various rough demos of songs that would later be featured on their first full-length album, Marvin's Marvelous Mechanical Museum, as well as two live tracks recorded at The Blind Pig in Ann Arbor, Michigan (one of which was merely a banter track), and one recorded live on the Mitch Albom Show on WJR in Detroit, Michigan. The only completely polished studio track featured on the EP is "The Bidding".

The discs were burned on CD-Rs by the band and packaged in plain white CD envelopes with a clear, circular window on the front. Inside the envelope there was an insert with the liner notes for the EP.

Track listing

"The Bidding" – 2:32
"Taken For A Ride" (acoustic) – 4:30
"Be Born" (acoustic) – 3:24
"The Whole World and You" (acoustic) – 1:42
"All of My Friends" (acoustic) – 2:46
"Good Day" (live on the Mitch Albom Show) – 0:45
"Yearbook" (demo) – 2:32
"Just A Friend" (Biz Markie cover) (live at The Blind Pig) – 4:06
"Cell Phone Call" (banter track) – 1:18

2005 EPs
Tally Hall albums